Tucker Hume (born August 22, 1993) is an American soccer forward. He has a twin brother Walker Hume.

Playing career
In February 2017, Hume signed with Ottawa Fury FC in the United Soccer League.

On December 14, 2017, Hume signed with Nashville SC in the USL.

References

1993 births
Living people
American expatriate soccer players
American soccer players
Association football forwards
Austin Aztex players
Expatriate soccer players in Canada
Midland-Odessa Sockers FC players
Nashville SC (2018–19) players
North Carolina Tar Heels men's soccer players
Ottawa Fury FC players
People from San Angelo, Texas
Portland Timbers U23s players
Rollins Tars men's soccer players
Soccer players from Texas
American twins
Twin sportspeople
USL Championship players
USL League Two players